Olive Branch was launched in 1818 at Cowes. She was one of several vessels that a gale wrecked at the Cape of Good Hope (CGH; the Cape), on 21 July 1822. She returned to service and on some or more of her voyages to the Cape she sailed to Mauritius under a licence from the British East India Company (EIC). She burnt in November 1843 while sailing between Quebec and London.

Career
Olive Branch first entered Lloyd's Register (LR) in 1818.

On 1 May 1821 Olive Branch, Kidd, master, arrived at the Cape. On 3 March an unknown ship had run into her a  causing damages and carrying away Olive Branchs foremast and bowsprit.

On 21–22 July 1822 a tremendous gale drove Olive Branch, Kind, master, ashore at the Cape of Good Hope. She had been nearly loaded for London. A letter dated 10 August stated that the greater part of Olive Branchs cargo had been saved, but that she had been condemned. The next report was that Olive Branch, Kind, master, had been condemned and sold.

The entry for Olive Branch in the 1823 volume of LR carried the annotation "condemned&sold".
 
In 1823 Captain James Anderson brought Olive Branch and repaired her. 

Anderson remained master of Olive Branch until he died aboard the vessel on 26 August 1832, whilst on route to Cape Town. He had sailed from London on 25 June 1832, bound for Mauritius and sailing under a licence from the EIC.

Fate
Olive Branch burnt on 6 November 1843 at the mouth of the Saguenay River. She was carrying a cargo of deals. Her crew were saved.

Citations

References
 

1818 ships
Ships built in England
Age of Sail merchant ships of England
Maritime incidents in July 1822
Maritime incidents in November 1843